Elections to Liverpool City Council were held on Saturday 1 November 1890. One third of the council seats were up for election, the term of office of each councillor being three years.

After the election, the composition of the council was:

Election result

Ward results

* - Retiring Councillor seeking re-election

Abercromby

Castle Street

Everton

Exchange

Great George

Lime Street

North Toxteth

Pitt Street

Rodney Street

St. Anne Street

St. Paul's

St. Peter's

Scotland

South Toxteth

Vauxhall

West Derby

By-elections

No. 16, North Toxteth, 19 March 1891
Caused by the death of Alderman Anthony Bower on 31 January 1891.
Following this Councillor Thomas Hughes (Conservative, North Toxteth, elected 1 November 1888)  was elected as an Alderman by the Council on 4 March 1891

 resulting in a vacancy in the North Toxteth ward.

See also

 Liverpool City Council
 Liverpool Town Council elections 1835 - 1879
 Liverpool City Council elections 1880–present
 Mayors and Lord Mayors of Liverpool 1207 to present
 History of local government in England

References

1890
1890 English local elections
1890s in Liverpool